Mike Dudgeon (born December 6, 1967) is an American politician who served in the Georgia House of Representatives from 2011 to 2017.

References

1967 births
Living people
Republican Party members of the Georgia House of Representatives